Charles P. Austin (1883-March 17, 1948) was an American painter who specialized in depictions of Spanish missions in California. He painted murals in St. Peter's Italian Church in Los Angeles and Our Lady of Mount Carmel Church in Montecito, California, and decorations at the Mission San Juan Capistrano in San Juan Capistrano.

References

1883 births
1948 deaths
Artists from Santa Monica, California
American male painters
American muralists
Painters from California
19th-century American painters
20th-century American painters
19th-century American male artists
20th-century American male artists